Musa M'Boob is a Gambian musician.

Early life and career
Musa was born in Serrekunda, Gambia, West Africa on 25 November 1963. He is the son of Doudou M’Boob, the Gambian percussionist. 

In 1985, he became a professional performer, with percussion, singing and dance, following a family tradition, which can be traced back at least six generations. He became very popular playing at traditional baby naming ceremonies, weddings and concert appearances. In 1987, he was invited to become Technical Director of Youth Against Drugs and Alcohol, in their theatre group in Banjul, the Gambia, West Africa. His duties included lecturing people from Germany, Sweden and Holland, on the subject of Rhythm Communication. In July 1988, he took part in the Gambian Cultural Festival, at which he was awarded a certificate recognizing him as the No. 1 Percussionist in the Gambia. The award was presented by the Minister of Culture and the Director of Arts and Culture. In 1990, he was invited to England to record the album entitled Mboob Mbalahal, meaning Mboob playing the drum. Since his first trip to England with Ifang Bondi, Musa has continued working as a cultural ambassador promoting Gambian music both in the Gambia and in the UK and Europe. As of 2009, he is touring and recording with Alan Skidmore & Ubizo, 2 tracks on latest album "50 Journeys", and collaborating with Ousman Beyai (former Ifang Bondi member) band named "Xam Xam". Musa Mboob currently lives in Peacehaven, East Sussex on the south coast of England and is involved in many project helping to bring musicians together from Europe and the Gambia.

References

Gambian musicians
People from Peacehaven
Living people
1963 births
Gambian singers